Dianne M. Stewart is an associate professor of Religion and African American Studies at Emory University. Stewart's work focuses on religion, culture and African heritage in the Caribbean and the Americas.

Personal life
Dianne M. Stewart was born in Kingston, Jamaica, and grew up in Hartford, CT, USA. In 1990, Stewart obtained her B.A. degree from Colgate University in English and African American Studies. In 1993, she obtained her Masters of Divinity in theology and culture, specializing in African American Religious Thought from the Harvard Divinity School. In 1997, she received a Ph.D. in systematic theology, specializing in African Diaspora Religious Thought & Cultures from Union Theological Seminary in New York City.

Stewart studied with scholars including Delores Williams, James Washington and her adviser James Cone.

Career 
From 1998 to 2001, Stewart was an assistant professor of religious studies at College of the Holy Cross. In 2001, she joined Emory's faculty, and is currently associate professor of religion and African American studies. where she instructs undergraduate and graduate courses focused on African American religion and culture.

Publications
Stewart's first monograph was titled, "Three Eyes for the Journey: African Dimensions of the Jamaican Religious Experience" and analyzed the motif of liberation in African heritage from the 18th to 21st century. Subsequently, Stewart has published a number of books and articles:

Awards and Fellowships 
Stewart received the Emory College of Arts and Sciences' Distinguished Advising Award, the Emory University Laney Graduate School's Eleanor Main Graduate Faculty Mentor Award, and a Senior Fellowship at the Bill and Carol Fox Center for Humanistic Inquiry. Over the course of her career, her honors include:

Committees 
Stewart served with the American Academy of Religion and is the founding co-editor with Dr. Jacob Olupona and Dr. Terrance Johnson of the Religious Cultures of African and African Diaspora People series at Duke University Press.

Fieldwork 
The focus of her research is African religions and the practices and religious thought of African-descended people in the regions of Anglophone Caribbean and the United States. Another aspect of her research is women's studies, particularly the approaches of women to theory and method of African religious studies. Stewart has lectured and worked in African, Latin American, and Caribbean countries including, Trinidad, Jamaica, Nigeria, The Benin Republic, South Africa, Brazil, Mexico, Guatemala, Cuba, the Dominican Republic, Congo, and Bermuda. Her book, Local and Transnational Legacies of African Christianity in West-Central Africa and the Black Atlantic World, considers how 18th century Kongolese Catholicism, influenced the formation of Afro-Protestant institutions among African people.

References

Year of birth missing (living people)
Colgate University alumni
Living people
Emory University faculty
College of the Holy Cross faculty
Union Theological Seminary (New York City) alumni
Harvard Divinity School alumni